Mirko Tomianovic Becerra (born October 1, 2001) is a Bolivian professional footballer who plays as a midfielder for Bolivian side Always Ready.

Playing career

Club career
Tomianovic was a member of the Bolívar youth team until 2018, when he joined Always Ready. In early 2019, at the age of 17, he was called up to the first team by manager Julio César Baldivieso. He made his professional debut on April 21, playing the first half of a 1–0 defeat to Blooming before being replaced by Marcos Ovejero.

International career
In 2017, Tomianovic represented the national under-17 team at the 2017 Bolivarian Games.

Career statistics

Club

Notes

References

External links

 
 

Living people
2001 births
Bolivian footballers
Bolivia youth international footballers
Association football midfielders
Club Always Ready players
Bolivian Primera División players
Bolivian people of Croatian descent